Luciano Quadros da Silva  ( Luciano Quadros, born April 10, 1974 in Porto Alegre, Rio Grande do Sul, Brazil), simply known as Luciano Quadros, is a Brazilian football manager and former football goalkeeper. He is the head coach of Campeonato Carioca club Cabofriense.

Career statistics

References

1974 births
Living people
Footballers from Porto Alegre
Brazilian footballers
Brazilian football managers
Brazil international footballers
Brazilian expatriate footballers
Association football goalkeepers
Expatriate footballers in Hong Kong
Brazilian expatriate sportspeople in Hong Kong
Campeonato Brasileiro Série A players
Campeonato Brasileiro Série B players
Campeonato Brasileiro Série C players
Hong Kong First Division League players
Sport Club Internacional players
Paysandu Sport Club players
Tuna Luso Brasileira players
Clube do Remo players
Associação Desportiva São Caetano players
União São João Esporte Clube players
Esporte Clube XV de Novembro (Piracicaba) players
Eastern Sports Club footballers
Kitchee SC players
Grêmio Catanduvense de Futebol players
Associação Ferroviária de Esportes players
Associação Atlética Portuguesa (Santos) players
Clube Atlético Linense managers
Audax Rio de Janeiro Esporte Clube managers
Marília Atlético Clube managers
Grêmio Osasco Audax Esporte Clube managers
Sampaio Corrêa Futebol e Esporte managers
Associação Desportiva Cabofriense managers
Clube Atlético Taboão da Serra managers
Bonsucesso Futebol Clube managers
Hong Kong League XI representative players